The Women's Freestyle 50 kg was a competition featured at the 2022 European Wrestling Championships, and was held in Budapest, Hungary  on March 30 and 31.

Medalists

Results 
 Legend
 F — Won by fall

Main Bracket

Repechage

Final standing

References

External links
Draw

Women's Freestyle 50 kg
2022 in women's sport wrestling